Erasmo Salemme (born   26 March 1946) is a retired Italian volleyball player and coach. He won three national titles (1967–68, 1970–71 and 1972–73) with the Ruini Florence team. He played 231 matches with the Italian national team, winning a gold medal at the 1970 Turin Universiade, a silver at the 1975 Mediterranean Games, and finishing eights at the 1976 Summer Olympics.

References 

1946 births
Sportspeople from Rome
Living people
Italian men's volleyball players
Olympic volleyball players of Italy
Volleyball players at the 1976 Summer Olympics
Mediterranean Games silver medalists for Italy
Competitors at the 1975 Mediterranean Games
Mediterranean Games medalists in volleyball
Universiade medalists in volleyball
Universiade gold medalists for Italy